Chin Siu-ho (born 26 January 1963) is a Hong Kong actor and martial artist, notable for acting with Jet Li in Tai Chi Master and Fist of Legend.

Background
He is the older brother of actor Chin Kar-lok and ex-husband of Sharon Kwok Sau Wan, and started martial arts training when he was 10 years old.
Chin has performed in over 90 films for famous companies like Shaw Film Company and Golden Harvest Films since the 1970s. He started to gain popularity in the 1980s. His first leading role in the career was Hu Fei in Legend of the Fox. He has performed a lot of horror and gangster films. His recent performance in films industry include Rigor Mortis, Happiness and Vampire Cleanup Department.

Chin heroically rescued a woman who had been held hostage in 1994. At the 2016 Golden Flower Awards International Film Festival, Chin won the Best Actor in a Leading Role in a Micro Movie Award for Rest Is Pending.

Filmography
 Ten Tigers of Kwangtung (1980)
 Legend of the Fox (1980)
 Two Champions of Shaolin (1981)
 The Rebel Intruders (1980)
 Masked Avengers (1981)
 Mahjong Heroes (1981)
 House of Traps (1982)
 The Brave Archer and His Mate (1982)
 Rolls, Rolls, I Love You (1982)
 Brothers From the Walled City (1982)
 Fast Fingers (1983)
 Ghosts Galore (1983)
 Demon of the Lute (1983)
 I Will Finally Knock You Down, Dad! (1984)
 The Legend Continues (1984) (TV series)
 Twinkle, Twinkle Lucky Stars (1985)
 The Man Is Dangerous (1985)
 Mr. Vampire (1985)
 Crazy Shaolin Disciples (1985)
 The Master Strikes Back (1985)
 The Seventh Curse (1986)
 The Story of Doctor Sun Yat-sen (1986)
 Millionaire's Express (1986)
 Love Me Vampire (1986)
 The Final Test (1987)
 New Mr. Vampire (1987)
 Edge of Darkness (1988)
 In the Blood (1988)
 Vampire vs Vampire (1989)
 Into the Fire (1989)
 They Came to Rob Hong Kong (1989)
 The Blonde Fury (1989)
 The Nocturnal Demon (1990)
 Goodbye Hero (1990)
 New Kids in Town (1990)
 The Ultimate Vampire (1991)
 Dead Target (1991)
 Magic Cop (1992)
 Come From China (1992)
 All-Mighty Gambler (1992)
 Hero Dream (1993)
 Happy Partner (1993)
 The Beheaded 1000 (1993)
 Tai Chi Master (1993)
 Fist of Legend (1994)
 Don't Give a Damn (1995)
 Stooge, My Love (1996)
 Millennium Dragon (1999)
 Undercover Girls  (1999)
 A Battle of Wits (2006)
 Ticket (2008)
 72 Tenants of Prosperity (2010)
 Vampire Warriors (2010)
 The Lost Bladesman (2011)
 Rigor Mortis (2013)
 Wudang Rules (2015) (TV series)
 Elite Brigade III (2015) (TV series)
 Happiness (2016)
 Vampire Cleanup Department (2017)
 Sinister Beings (2021)

References

External links

 Chin Siu-ho on the Hong Kong Movie Database

 Chin Siu-ho Stills on Maalaimalar.com

1963 births
Hong Kong male actors
Living people
Hong Kong male film actors
Male actors from Guangdong
People from Foshan
People from Sanshui District